Gani Odutokun (August 9, 1946 – February 15, 1995) was a contemporary Nigerian painter who is known for his contributions and nurturing of artists in the Zaria art society. His works include wall murals, paintings and book cover designs.

Early life and education
Odutokun was born in Nsawan, Ghana to Nigerian parents of Yoruba ethnicity who were originally from Offa, Kwara State and who were in the cocoa trade. He spent his early childhood growing up in Ashanti region but his father later relocated to Nigeria after a slump in the Cocoa trade. After secondary school, he worked as a clerk with Nigerian Breweries but with prodding from friends who saw his talent, he applied and got admission to Ahmadu Bello University, Zaria in 1972. He graduated from the college with a bachelor's and master's degree in Fine Arts in 1975 and 1979. After obtaining his bachelor's degree, he joined the Fine Arts department of ABU as a graduate assistant.

Career
Odutokun's artworks are known for exploring the nature of life. His paintings tend to explore philosophical concepts about "accident and design. " Some of his solo exhibitions include "Fragments and "The Seemingly Unbalanced Equilibrium", Some of his works also try to challenge Western expectations of African Art. At times, Odutokun included political commentary in his works. The 1988 painting, "The King Shares a Joke with his General", alludes to the pretentious ideals of liberalism the Babangida

Death
Odutokun died while returning from an Exhibition which followed a workshop held at the Goethe Institute in Lagos. He was among four artists who died in a vehicular accident. In February 1995, Time No Boundaries, an Exhibition with paintings from dozens of artists from Northern Nigeria region was held at the Maison de France, Alfred Rewane road in Odutokun's honour. In 2008, a memorial art exhibition by the Nigerian Gallery of Art in honor of Odutokun's paintings was held at the Aina Onabolu complex of the National Arts Theatre, Iganmu, Lagos.

References

External links
 Introduction to African Art

1946 births
1995 deaths
Ghanaian people of Yoruba descent
Ghanaian people of Nigerian descent
Road incident deaths in Nigeria
Yoruba artists
Ahmadu Bello University alumni
20th-century Nigerian painters
Academic staff of Ahmadu Bello University
Yoruba academics
Ghanaian emigrants to Nigeria